Resin is a web server and Java application server from Caucho Technology. In addition to Resin (GPL), Resin Pro is available for enterprise and production environments with a license. Resin supports the Java EE standard as well as a mod_php/PHP like engine called Quercus.

While Resin (GPL) is free for use in production, Resin Pro includes optimizations such as:
built-in caching 
public/private/or hybrid clustering 
advanced administration health system 
HTTP session replication 
distributed cache replication
auto-recovery & diagnostic reports

Although a Java-based server, key pieces of Resin's core networking are written in highly optimized C. Caucho states Java is the layer that allows Resin to be "full featured" while C provides the speed. Resin, which was released in 1999, predates Apache Tomcat, and is one of the most mature application servers and web servers.

Product features

Resin Pro has been engineered to include:

 Dynamic Clustering-  Locking was replaced with non-locking atomic operations, cleared contention bottlenecks, improved the async/epoll performance, and reduced thread overhead to handle 100,000 requests per second.
 Cloud Support- Elastic cluster members can be added or removed using a single command. Cluster topology, load balancing, caching, messaging and management automatically adapt to dynamic servers. 
 Compiled PHP on the JVM- Improves performance, scalability and security of PHP applications by allowing PHP code to directly call Java Objects. 
 Security though Open SSL integration- A comprehensive security framework for application authentication, authorization and transport level SSL based security. 
 Smart Software Load balancer- Application load is shared among resources automatically to balance them.
 Proxy cache- Faster application performance is possible with Java caching by saving the results of long calculations and reducing database load and application response time.

Scalability
 Elastic Clustering / Cloud support
3rd generation clustering optimized for Virtualization 2.0, EC2 and OpenStack deployments
 Session Replication
 Load balancing
 Distributed Cache 
 Memcached wire protocol for Couchbase Server like caching

Development
 Class compilation
 JIT Profiling and heap analysis
 No  required
 JUnit support
 Web Admin
 DevOps support via CLI and REST control of Resin
 Apache Ant/Maven/Ivy integration
 IDE integration
 Flexible project management
 Logging
Production Ready
 Reliability
 Server Monitoring
 Deployment / Cloud deployment
 Versioned deployment 
 Merge paths
 Troubleshooting aids
 Server health reports, baselining and post mortem reporting
 Throttling
App Server
 Java EE Web Profile certified,
 Java CDI
 standard Java dependency injection similar to Guice and Spring, part of Java EE 
 Transaction support

Web Server
 Static files/JSP/Servlet/JSF
 Extensible access logging
 URL rewriting
 Proxy caching (similar to Squid)
 Gzip compression
 
 Virtual Hosts
 Comet/Server push
 WebSocket
 mod-php like support via Quercus
 FastCGI

Usage
Resin's market share is small in the grand scheme of Java Application Servers, but some high traffic sites use it, such as Toronto Stock Exchange, Salesforce.com, Condé Nast (parent company of Wired, Vogue, GQ), CNET. NetCraft's February 2012 Survey stated Resin grew to 4,700,000 sites; Resin was the only Java-based web server mentioned.

A 2012-page on a Caucho wiki site describes a test procedure with results showing that tested 0k (empty HTML page), 1K, 8K and 64K byte files. At every level Resin matched or exceeded nginx web server performance.

Quercus

Quercus is a Java-based implementation of the PHP language that is included with Resin.  According to a slideshow presented by Emil Ong (from Caucho), to a San Francisco Java Meetup Group in April 2008 pertaining to Resin 3.1, an essential difference in the operation of Quercus between the Resin Open Source and the Resin Professional editions is that in Resin Professional the PHP is compiled to Java bytecode whereas in the open source version PHP is executed by an interpreter.

Caucho stated in 2007 that Quercus was faster than standard PHP 5 (PHP 8 with JIT is much faster than older PHP versions; PHP 5 is no longer supported) although this is only true for the JIT-compiled version in Resin Professional.  Quercus ships with Resin.

Licensing
One license covers all components of the Resin architecture.

Resin is provided in both an open source GPL license and a Pro version with enhancements for enterprises.

See also

 Comparison of application servers

References

External links
Resin Features

Cross-platform software
Java enterprise platform
Web server software programmed in Java